The Carlow Senior Hurling Championship is an annual hurling competition contested by top-tier Carlow GAA clubs.

Mount Leinster Rangers are the title holders (2020) defeating Ballinkillen in the Final.

History
Since 1927, with the exception of the 'foot and mouth' year of 1941, a 'Premier' Carlow Hurling Championship has been completed. Carlow's premier hurling championship was first awarded senior status in 1960, as the county team had won promotion to Division 1 of the N.H.L. following back-to-back Division 2 title wins.

St Mullin's are the Carlow kingpins, with their 27 titles including pre-1960 titles that were won in Carlow's premier hurling competition in those days.

Honours
The trophy presented to the winners is ? The winners of the Carlow Championship winners qualify to represent their county in the Leinster Club Championship, the winners of which go on to the All-Ireland Senior Club Hurling Championship.

List of finals

Wins listed by club

References

External links
http://www.carlowgaa.ie/ 
Carlow on Hoganstand
Carlow Club GAA

 
Hurling competitions in County Carlow
Hurling competitions in Leinster
Senior hurling county championships